First of a Living Breed is the fourth studio album by American rapper Homeboy Sandman. It was released by Stones Throw Records on September 18, 2012. It peaked at number 75 on the Billboard Top R&B/Hip-Hop Albums chart.

Critical reception

At Metacritic, which assigns a weighted average score out of 100 to reviews from mainstream critics, the album received an average score of 77, based on 8 reviews, indicating "generally favorable reviews".

NPR Music included it in the "50 Favorite Albums of 2012" list. The Village Voice placed it at number 5 on the "Ten Best New York City Rap Albums of 2012" list.

Track listing

Personnel
Credits adapted from liner notes.

 Homeboy Sandman – vocals
 Jonwayne – production (1, 10)
 Oddisee – production (2)
 J57 – production (3, 5)
 Howard Lloyd – production (4)
 Invisible Think – production (6)
 6th Sense – production (7)
 RTNC – production (8, 12, 14)
 2 Hungry Bros. – production (9)
 Reality – production (11)
 Oh No – production (13)
 Jeff Jank – sleeve design
 Joel Frijhoff – photography

Charts

References

External links
 
 

2012 albums
Homeboy Sandman albums
Stones Throw Records albums
Albums produced by Oh No (musician)